Malarvadi Arts Club is a 2010 Indian Malayalam-language musical comedy film written and directed by Vineeth Sreenivasan in his directorial debut, produced by actor Dileep. In the film, Five friends take the responsibility of reviving their favourite hang-out as they are unhappy with its functioning. However, they end up facing various problems while trying to keep the club alive. 

The film was released in 70 screens in Kerala alone. The cast of five young boys and two girls were selected through a talent hunt. The movie was a commercial success at the box office.

Plot 
The story is about the life of 5 friends in a small village called Manissery. They have completed their studies and are all set to move to the next phase of their life. But in the process they face unexpected problems while trying to keep their favourite hangout Malarvadi Arts Club alive.

"Malarvadi Koottam" (Malarvadi guys) are a bunch of trouble makers in the Manassery village. They even act as goons for a Communist party, named Labour Party. The first half of the film is about the pointless lives of these five led by Prakashan. Prakashan has a fiery temperament; he would do anything for the people he loves, for the cause he believes in.
In a moment of financial crisis, Kumaran (their mentor who formed Malarvadi club) makes the group take up music once again. On the way, the best singer Santhosh Damodaran in the group gets a chance to attend a reality show. Predictably, he makes it big, which is followed by misunderstandings, separation and a grand reunion in the end.

Cast

Reception

Box office
The film opened in 70 screens in Kerala alone on 16 July 2010 was a commercial success at the box office. The film was made on a cost of 6 crore and earned an amount of 40 crore.

Critical response
The movie received positive reviews. 

Paresh C Palicha of Rediff gave the film 3.5 out of five stars praising Vineeth Sreenivasan on his directorial debut stated that "Malarvadi Arts Club shows that Vineeth Sreenivasan does hold promise as a director, who can only improve with experience. He has made a film that will make the viewer smile". Sify rating it as Watchable movie said "The five new heroes, who were selected after talent hunts and rehearsal camps, have performed quite well".

Soundtrack
The film's soundtrack contains 6 songs, all composed by Shaan Rahman, with lyrics by Vineeth Sreenivasan.

References

External links
 
 https://web.archive.org/web/20101203204113/http://popcorn.oneindia.in/title/4070/malarvadi-arts-club.html
 http://www.nowrunning.com/movie/7298/malayalam/malarvady-arts-club/index.htm
 http://movies.rediff.com/report/2010/mar/12/south-malayalam-first-look-malarvady-arts-club.htm
 http://movies.rediff.com/slide-show/2010/jun/04/slide-show-1-south-looking-at-vineeth-sreenivasans-malarvady-arts-club.htm

2010 films
2010s Malayalam-language films
Films produced by Dileep
2010 directorial debut films
Films directed by Vineeth Sreenivasan
Films scored by Shaan Rahman
Films shot in Thalassery
Films shot in Thrissur